Bonginkosi Gumede (born 19 July 1998) is a South African professional footballer who plays as a midfielder for Jomo Cosmos.

Career
Born in Soweto, Gumede joined National First Division team Jomo Cosmos in July 2019. He made his debut for Cosmos on 18 August 2019, coming on as a substitute for midfielder Tumi Ngwepe in the 73rd minute against TS Galaxy. The match ended in a 0–0 draw.

Career statistics

References

1998 births
Living people
South African soccer players
Association football midfielders
Jomo Cosmos F.C. players